"Nowhere to Run, Nowhere to Hide" is the second single released from the Gravediggaz' debut album, 6 Feet Deep. Produced by the group's producer, Prince Paul (The Undertaker), "Nowhere to Run, Nowhere to Hide" was a minor hit on the Rap charts, where it peaked at 32. The song interpolates Martha and the Vandellas "Nowhere to Run".

Single track listing

A-Side
"Nowhere to Run, Nowhere to Hide" (Album Version)- 3:55  
"Nowhere to Run, Nowhere to Hide" (Clean Radion Edit)- 3:35  
"Nowhere to Run, Nowhere to Hide" (Instrumental)- 3:56

B-Side
"Freak the Sorceress"- 3:57  
"Freak the Sorceress" (Instrumental)- 3:57  
"The Reincarnation of Freud"- 1:17  
"Nowhere to Run, Nowhere to Hide" (Acappella)- 3:55

Charts

References

1993 songs
1994 singles
Gravediggaz songs
Song recordings produced by Prince Paul (producer)